Ten-ball (or ten-ball, 10 ball, 10-ball and other variant spellings) is a pool (pocket billiards) game, played with ten object balls, of which the 10 ball  is the game-winning ball. It may also refer to:

 10 ball, the pool (pocket billiards) ball numbered "10", and colored with a blue stripe
 10-ball, a ten-dimensional -ball in mathematics